Qazi Habibul Bashar (born 17 August 1972) is a retired Bangladeshi cricketer and the former captain of the Bangladesh cricket team. Under the managership of Dav Whatmore, he has been found to be the most successful captain to lead the Bangladesh team to overcome several milestones. The first test victory of Bangladesh came under his hands in 2004 against Zimbabwe. Under Bashar's captaincy, Bangladesh have beaten Australia, India, South Africa and Sri Lanka in limited overs matches. Bashar is currently one of the chief selectors of BCB, along with Abdur Razzak and Minhajul Abedin.

Early career
In 1989 Bashar played for the Bangladesh Under-19 team in the U-19 Asia Cup. Through the 1990s he played his domestic cricket for Biman Bangladesh Airlines. His ODI debut came at the 1995 Asia Cup against Sri Lanka. He missed the 1997 ICC Trophy, in which Bangladesh were the champions but did play in the Asia Cup of that year. He was also left out of the 1999 World Cup squad. After the World Cup he again entered the team and with Eddie Barlow's inspiration he got the chance to play more.

Keeping up with the traditional inconsistency with announcing the side, Bashar was again out of the team for Bangladesh's inaugural test. His consistent performance before the test drew the attention of the press and after heavy criticism from them he was finally included in the side. Bashar made the first fifty in the history of Bangladesh Test cricket to prove his ability.

Career story
Bashar was one of Bangladesh's leading batsmen. He was the captain of Bangladesh from January 2004 to June 2007, during this time he led the team to some notable successes. When Zimbabwe toured Bangladesh in January 2005, Bangladesh recorded their first Test match win, their first Test series win, and their first One Day International series win. In June 2005, Bangladesh beat the world champions Australia in a One Day International in Cardiff. In April 2006, they came close to beating Australia in a Test match, taking a first-innings lead of 158, eventually losing by three wickets. Bangladesh lost the ODI series with Zimbabwe in August 2006 by 3–2, but beat them in the last qualifying match of the Champions Trophy. Thanks to these efforts, Bangladesh are currently above Zimbabwe in the LG ICC ODI rankings, and showing that they are improving by the match.

Bashar had a disappointing 2007 World Cup as a batsman, with an average of only 13.12 and a highest score of 32. In spite of this, Bangladesh performed relatively well. Following a 1–0 test series defeat to India, Bashar resigned as ODI captain but wanted to remain part of the ODI team. However, despite stating that he wanted to continue to be test captain, Bashar was removed from this position on 2 June 2007 and replaced by Mohammad Ashraful who also took over as ODI captain.
On 14 September, he announced his retirement from international cricket. Then he became the captain of the Dhaka Warriors side in ICL.At the end of 2009 he retired from ICL and came back at the mainstream of Bangladesh cricket. He has retired from all forms of professional cricket after playing the 2009/10 season. Currently he is playing in the local weekend cricket tournament for The Josephite Warriors. Bashar was also a national Goodwill Ambassador for UNICEF in Bangladesh. On 20 January 2022, Bashar joined Asia Lions along with Mohammad Rafique in Legends League Cricket.

2017 Champions Trophy 
Habibul Bashar set to represent Bangladesh as the brand ambassador during the 2017 ICC Champions Trophy.

Career milestones

Tests
Test Debut: vs India, Bangabandhu, 2000
 He made his highest score of 113 in Test cricket against West Indies, 2004.

ODIs
ODI Debut: vs Sri Lanka, Sharjah, 1995
 He made his highest score of 78 in ODI cricket against Zimbabwe, 2007

References

External links
 

1972 births
Living people
Bangladesh One Day International cricketers
Bangladesh Test cricketers
Bangladesh Test cricket captains
Bangladeshi cricketers
20th-century Bangladeshi cricketers
21st-century Bangladeshi cricketers
Biman Bangladesh Airlines cricketers
Cricketers at the 2003 Cricket World Cup
Khulna Division cricketers
Dhaka Warriors cricketers
ICL Bangladesh XI cricketers
Mohammedan Sporting Club cricketers
Brothers Union cricketers
People from Kushtia District